Louis Charles Kiener (31 July 1799 – 24 July 1881) was a French malacologist born in Paris.

He was the author of the 12-volume Spécies général et iconographie des coquilles vivantes comprenant la collection du Muséum d'histoire naturelle de Paris, la collection Lamarck, celle du prince Masséna (appartenant maintenant a M.B. Delessert) et les découvertes récentes des voyageurs, translated into English as "General species and iconography of recent shells : comprising the Massena Museum, the collection of Lamarck, the collection of the Museum of Natural History, and the recent discoveries of travellers.

The following are a few species named after him:
Lophotriorchis kienerii (G. de Sparre, 1835)
Murexsul kieneri (Reeve, 1845)
Thais kieneri (Deshayes, 1844)
Cypraea kieneri (Kiener's cowry) (Hidalgo, 1906).

Bibliography 
 Kiener L. C. (1839). Genre Pleurotome. (Pleurotoma, Lam.). In: “Spécies Général et Iconographie des Coquilles Vivantes 5”. J. B. Baillière. Paris. pp. 17–84.

References 

1799 births
1881 deaths
French malacologists